The Shire  is the largest river in Malawi. It is the only outlet of Lake Malawi and flows into the Zambezi River in Mozambique. The upper Shire River issues from Lake Malawi and runs approximately  before it enters shallow Lake Malombe. It then drains Lake Malombe and flows south through Liwonde National Park where large concentrations of hippopotamus are common along its shores. Between the towns of Matope and Chikwawa, the middle river drops approximately  through a series of falls and gorges, including Kapachira Falls. Two hydroelectric dams have been built along the Shire northwest of Blantyre.

Beyond Chikwawa, the lower river turns southeast and enters the low-lying Mozambique plain.  Its largest and one of its few perennial tributaries, the Ruo River, joins the Shire near the Malawian town of Chiromo.  The muddy waters pass through a large stagnant area known as the Elephant Marsh before reaching the confluence with the Zambezi River south of the town of Sena, Mozambique.

In 1859, David Livingstone's Second Zambezi expedition traveled up the Shire river.

The river's valley is part of the East African Rift system.

References 

 
Rivers of Malawi
Rivers of Mozambique
Lake Malawi
Tributaries of the Zambezi River
International rivers of Africa